Solvay may refer to:

Companies and organizations
 Solvay Brussels School of Economics and Management, Brussels, Belgium
 Solvay Institute of Sociology, Brussels, Belgium, part of the Université Libre de Bruxelles
 Solvay Process Company (1880–1985), a former U.S. company that employed the Solvay process
 Solvay S.A., an international chemicals and plastics company founded by Ernest Solvay

Places
 Solvay, New York, a village in New York, United States
 Mount Solvay, part of Belgica Mountains in Queen Maud Land, Antarctica
 Solvay Mountains, Brabant Island, off the coast of Antarctica

Buildings
 Solvay Castle, La Hulpe, Belgium
 Hôtel Solvay, a town house in Brussels, Belgium
 Solvay Hut, a mountain hut on the Matterhorn, Switzerland

People
 Ernest Solvay (1838–1922), Belgian chemist, inventor of the Solvay process
 Lucien Solvay (1851–1950), Belgian journalist, art historian, and poet
 Paolo Solvay, pseudonym of Luigi Batzella (1924–2008), Italian film director and actor

Other uses
 Solvay Conference, founded by Ernest Solvay, deals with open questions in physics and chemistry
 Solvay Public Library, a historic Carnegie library in New York, United States; on the National Register of Historic Places
 Solvay process, a major industrial chemical process
 7537 Solvay, an asteroid

See also
 Solway (disambiguation)